The black-throated wattle-eye (Platysteira peltata) is a species of bird in the family Platysteiridae.
It is found in Angola, Burundi, Democratic Republic of the Congo, Eswatini, Kenya, Malawi, Mozambique, Somalia, South Africa, Tanzania, Uganda, Zambia, and Zimbabwe.

References

External links
 Black-throated wattle-eye - Species text in The Atlas of Southern African Birds.

black-throated wattle-eye
Birds of Southern Africa
Birds of Sub-Saharan Africa
black-throated wattle-eye
Taxonomy articles created by Polbot